The Slovenia national under-21 speedway team is the national under-21 motorcycle speedway team of Slovenia and is controlled by the Automobile Association of Slovenia. The team has never qualify to the Under-21 World Cup finals. Two Slovenian riders, Matej Ferjan and Matej Žagar has won bronze medal of the Individual U-21 World Championship.

Competition

See also 
 Slovenia national speedway team

External links 
 (si) (en) Automobile Association of Slovenia webside

National speedway teams
Speedway, Under-21
Team